This article lists events that occurred during 1966 in Estonia.

Incumbents

Events
August 2 – Tallinn Old Town Conservation Area was established.

Births
23 April – Lembit Oll, chess player
27 August – Juhan Parts, politician

Deaths
19 December – Betty Kuuskemaa, actress (b. 1879)

References

 
1960s in Estonia
Estonia
Estonia
Years of the 20th century in Estonia